The 2003 CAA men's basketball tournament was held from March 7–10, 2003 at the Richmond Coliseum in Richmond, Virginia. The winner of the tournament was UNC-Wilmington, who received an automatic bid to the 2003 NCAA Men's Division I Basketball Tournament.

Bracket

Honors

References

-2003 CAA men's basketball tournament
Colonial Athletic Association men's basketball tournament
CAA men's basketball tournament
CAA men's basketball tournament
Sports competitions in Virginia
Basketball in Virginia